Alena Brooks (born 14 November 1991) is a middle-distance runner from Trinidad and Tobago specialising in the 800 metres. She represented her country at two editions of Commonwealth Games and two editions of Pan American Games. In addition, she won a silver medal at the 2018 Central American and Caribbean Games.

International competitions

Personal bests
Outdoor
400 metres – 53.55 (Tucson 2011)
800 metres – 2:01.81 (Gold Coast 2018) NR
1500 metres – 4:33.82 (Fayetteville 2018)

Indoor
400 metres – 54.08 (Fayetteville 2019)
800 metres – 2:04.09 (Fayetteville 2018) NR
1500 metres – 4:33.82 (Fayetteville 2018)
One mile – 5:21.29 (Fayetteville 2017)

References

1991 births
Living people
Trinidad and Tobago female middle-distance runners
Pan American Games competitors for Trinidad and Tobago
Athletes (track and field) at the 2014 Commonwealth Games
Athletes (track and field) at the 2015 Pan American Games
Athletes (track and field) at the 2018 Commonwealth Games
Athletes (track and field) at the 2019 Pan American Games
People from Diego Martin
Central American and Caribbean Games medalists in athletics
Commonwealth Games competitors for Trinidad and Tobago